The Twelfth Oklahoma Legislature was a meeting of the legislative branch of the government of Oklahoma, composed of the Oklahoma Senate and the Oklahoma House of Representatives. The state legislature met in Oklahoma City, in regular session from January 8 to March 30, 1929, and in one special session. State legislators successfully impeached Governor Henry S. Johnston during the legislative session.

Dates of sessions
Regular session: January 8-March 30, 1929
Previous: 11th Legislature • Next: 13th Legislature

Major events
When the state legislature met in regular session in 1929, members of the Oklahoma House of Representatives presented 13 charges against Governor Henry S. Johnston. On January 21, Johnston was suspended from office and Lieutenant Governor William J. Holloway became acting governor. Johnston’s impeachment trial began in February and ended in March with his impeachment on one charge. Holloway then succeeded Johnston to become the eighth governor of Oklahoma.
Governor William J. Holloway called a special session on May 16, 1929. The state legislature adjourned on July 5, with the resolution of acquiring toll bridges along the border.

Party composition

Senate

House of Representatives

House of Representatives table.

Leadership
C.S. Storms served as President pro tempore of the Oklahoma Senate in 1929. James C. Nance served as Speaker of the Oklahoma House of Representatives.

Members

Senate

Table based on state almanac.

House of Representatives

Table based on government database.

References

External links
Oklahoma Legislature
Oklahoma House of Representatives
Oklahoma Senate

Oklahoma legislative sessions
1929 in Oklahoma
1930 in Oklahoma
1929 U.S. legislative sessions
1930 U.S. legislative sessions